The County of Schaumburg, until ca. 1485 known as Schauenburg,  was a state of the Holy Roman Empire, located in the present German state of Lower Saxony.  Its territory was more or less congruent with the present district .

History
Schaumburg originated as a medieval county, which was founded at the beginning of the 12th century. It was named after Schauenburg Castle, near Rinteln on the Weser, where the owners started calling themselves Lords (from 1295 Counts) of Schauenburg. Adolf I probably became the first Lord of Schauenburg in 1106.

In 1110, Adolf I, Lord of Schauenburg was appointed by Lothair, Duke of Saxony to hold Holstein and Stormarn, including Hamburg, as fiefs. Subsequently, the House of Schaumburg were also counts of Holstein and its partitions Holstein-Itzehoe, Holstein-Kiel, Holstein-Pinneberg (until 1640), Holstein-Plön, Holstein-Segeberg and Holstein-Rendsburg (until 1460) and through the latter at times also the dukes of Schleswig.

Count Adolf IV was an active ruler and founded the cities of Stadthagen and Rinteln.

From 1500 the County of Schaumburg belonged to the Lower Rhenish-Westphalian Circle of the Holy Roman Empire.

After the childless death in 1640 of Count Otto V, the House of Schaumburg became extinct. The County of Holstein-Pinneberg was merged with the Duchy of Holstein. The County of Schaumburg proper was partitioned among the agnatic Schaumburg heirs into three parts, one incorporated into the ducal Brunswick and Lunenburgian Principality of Lüneburg, the largest portion becoming the County of Schaumburg-Lippe, and the eastern territory continuing the name County of Schaumburg, ruled in personal union by Hesse-Cassel. All three are now part of the state of Lower Saxony.

When the District of Schaumburg was formed in middle Lower Saxony in 1977, it chose to use a coat of arms derived from the ancient arms of the Counts of Schaumberg.

Counts of Schauenburg
1106–1130 Adolf I
1130–1164 Adolf II
1164–1225 Adolf III
1225–1238 Adolf IV
1238–1290 Gerhard I
1290–1315 Adolf VI
1315–1354 Adolf VII
1354–1370 Adolf VIII
1370–1404 Otto I
1404–1426 Adolf IX
1426–1464 Otto II (1400–1464)
1464–1474 Adolf X (1419–1474)
1474–1492 Erich (1420–1492)
1492–1510 Otto III (1426–1510)
1510–1526 Antonius (1439–1526)
1526–1527 John IV (1449–1527)
1527–1531 Jobst I (1483–1531)
1531–1560 John V (joint rule with his brother Otto IV since 1544)
1531–1581 Jobst II (ca. 1520–1581) ruled the Herrschaft of Gemen
1544–1576 Otto IV (1517–1576), prince-bishop of Hildesheim in 1531–1537 as Otto III, converted to the teachings of Martin Luther and began Reformation in 1559, jointly with his brother John V until 1560
1576–1601 Adolf XI (1547–1601)
1601–1622 Ernst (1569–1622)
1622–1635 Jobst Herman (1593–1635)
1635–1640 Otto V (1614–1640)

See also 
Schaumburg-Lippe
Schaumburg

Bibliography 
 Matthias Blazek: Die Grafschaft Schaumburg 1647–1977. ibidem, Stuttgart 2011 
 Walter Maack: Die Geschichte der Grafschaft Schaumburg, 3. Aufl., Rinteln 1986

References

External links

Map of the counties of Schaumburg and Schaumburg-Lippe in 1789

Counties of the Holy Roman Empire
Lower Rhenish-Westphalian Circle
1110s establishments in the Holy Roman Empire
1110 establishments in Europe
1640 disestablishments in Europe